The I.P. Campbell Building, located at 116 W. Main St. in Harper, Kansas, was built in 1881.  It was listed on the National Register of Historic Places in 2006.

It includes Gothic Revival architecture. It is a two-story slab-on-grade structure with native red sandstone walls. Its facade is trimmed with limestone. Its rear wall was replaced in 2001 after the stone wall collapsed.

References

Commercial buildings on the National Register of Historic Places in Kansas
Gothic Revival architecture in Kansas
Buildings and structures completed in 1881
Harper County, Kansas